The Gregory Range is a mountain range located in Far North Queensland, Australia.

Location and features

The range is located in an area of ephemeral watercourses and stony sandstone ridges lightly vegetated with Eucalyptus miniata, acacia and spinifex on the ridge tops. Further down the ridges areas of paperbark are found. The southern portion forms an undulating sandstone and basalt plateau. The sandstone is of the Jurassic age (180-160 million years) while the basalt and granite dates from the Mesoproterozoic age (1.6 - 1.0 billion years). This portion is covered in open forest of Bloodwood, wattle, eucalypts and spear grass. The Stawall River flows south from the range and is a tributary of the Flinders River.

The Norman River and three of its tributaries the Carron, Clara and Yappar Rivers, also have their headwaters in the range. The flow from these rivers is westward into the Gulf of Carpentaria The Gilbert and Robertson Rivers also have there headwaters in the range but flow northward.

The first European to travel through the area was the explorer Augustus Charles Gregory in 1855 or 1856 as part of his expedition from Port Essington to Brisbane. The range was named by the explorer John McKinlay in 1862 while on an expedition from Adelaide, which he left from in 1861, in search of the lost Burke and Wills expedition.

See also

List of mountains in Queensland

References

Mountain ranges of Queensland
Landforms of Far North Queensland